Erik Eriksen (20 November 1902 – 7 October 1972) was a Danish politician, who served as Prime Minister of Denmark from 1950 to 1953 and as the fourth President of the Nordic Council in 1956. Eriksen was leader of the Danish Liberal party Venstre from 1950 to 1965. He served as Prime Minister of Denmark from 30 October 1950 to 30 September 1953 as leader of the Eriksen cabinet forming a minority government of Venstre and the Conservative People's Party. Eriksen was a farmer by profession.

The main accomplishment by his government was a revision of the Danish constitution, voted into law in a referendum held in 1953 simultaneously with the parliamentary elections. In addition, a family allowance law was passed in 1952, along with other reforms during Eriksen's time as prime minister. The Rent Act of June 1951, while permitting certain rent increases, extended rent control and security of tenure to cover houses constructed after 1939. In addition, the Public Assistance Act of March 1953 introduced special treatment and assistance for patients with polio. The former Venstre leader and former Prime Minister Knud Kristensen had broken away from  Venstre to form his own party, De Uafhængige. This was one of reasons why the social democrat Hans Hedtoft was able to secure the parliamentary support to replace Eriksen as Prime Minister and form the Hedtoft cabinet.

After 1953, Eriksen continued as the leader of the opposition but in the long run his consequent alliance with the Conservatives proved an obstacle to a co-operation with the Radical Left Party. He therefore resigned as the leader of his party in 1965 and was succeeded by Poul Hartling.

References
Kristian Hvidt, Statsministre i Danmark fra 1913 til 1995 (1995)
Social Democracy and Welfare Capitalism: A Century of Income Security Politics by Alexander Hicks
Growth to Limits: The Western European Welfare States Since World War II, Volume 4 edited by Peter Flora

1902 births
1972 deaths
People from Faaborg-Midtfyn Municipality
Prime Ministers of Denmark
Members of the Folketing
20th-century Danish politicians
Agriculture ministers of Denmark
Leaders of Venstre (Denmark)